Because of a Flower is a 1967 Philippine drama film directed by Luis Nepomuceno. The film was selected as the Philippine entry for the Best Foreign Language Film at the 40th Academy Awards, but was not accepted as a nominee. It was the first Filipino film to be shot in color by De Luxe.

Cast
 Charito Solis as Margarita
 Ric Rodrigo as Edilberto
 Paraluman as Victoria
 Rod Navarro as Tony
 Ben Perez as Juan
 Liza Lorena as Esperanza
 Grace Leonor as Cora
 Henry Stevens as Alvaro
 Matimtiman Cruz as Monica
 Joseph de Cordova as Padre
 Mary Walter as Tony's Mother
 Pianing Vidal as Arsobispo

References

External links
 

1967 films
1967 drama films
Philippine drama films
Tagalog-language films